PMHS may refer to:
 Polymethylhydrosiloxane

Schools 
 Parramatta Marist High School, Westmead, New South Wales, Australia
 Parry McCluer High School, Buena Vista, Virginia, United States
 Pasadena Memorial High School, Pasadena, Texas, United States
 Patchogue-Medford High School, Medford, New York, United States
 Pedro Menendez High School, St. Augustine, Florida, United States
 Pelham Memorial High School, Pelham, New York, United States
 Penn Manor High School, Millersville, Pennsylvania, United States
 Pennsville Memorial High School, Pennsville, New Jersey, United States
 Perry Meridian High School, Indianapolis, Indiana, United States
 Philadelphia Mennonite High School, Philadelphia, Pennsylvania, United States
 Picayune Memorial High School, Picayune, Mississippi, United States
 Port Macquarie High School, Port Macquarie, New South Wales, Australia